John Alfray may refer to:

John Alfray (fl. 1360s), MP for East Grinstead in 1360s, father of John Alfray (fl. 1391)
John Alfray (fl. 1391), MP for East Grinstead in 1391
John Alfray (fl. 1421–1422), MP for East Grinstead in December 1421 and 1422
John Alfray (fl. 1447–1459), MP for East Grinstead